The Ministry of State Domains and Land Affairs (Arabic: وزارة أملاك الدولة والشؤون العقارية ) is a department of the Government of Tunisia.

Ministers 

 Leïla Jaffel (Mechichi Cabinet)
  (Bouden Cabinet)

References 

Government ministries of Tunisia
Ministries established in 1990
1990 establishments in Tunisia